Munier Mohammed Yassine Raychouni (born 29 December 1986) is a football manager and former player, who is the current manager of German club Berliner AK 07.

Born in Germany to a Lebanese father and German mother, Raychouni played in Germany, Singapore, Lebanon and Indonesia.

Playing career

Early career
Raychouni played youth football for S.C. Berliner Amateure 1920, 1. FC Wilmersdorf, and Tennis Borussia Berlin.

Singapore
Flying to Singapore to trial for Woodlands Wellington of the local S.League in January 2011, due to Canadian footballer Sergio De Luca contacting them, Raychouni eventually signed a one-year contract with the club. He recorded his first appearance in a 1–0 defeat to Hougang United, playing the full 90 minutes. Provided with a remuneration and an apartment by Woodlands Wellington, the Lebanese footballer operated mostly as a centre-back throughout his stay there, sometimes selected as captain and ending the season with 31 appearances.

Lebanon
For the 2012–13 season, Raychouni was under contract with Lebanese Premier League club Safa, also participating in the 2013 AFC Cup.

Thailand and India trials
In July 2013, Thai Premier League side Pattaya United contacted Raychouni to negotiate a possible transfer. However, the move never occurred. The next year, he tried out for Salgaocar, then of the Indian I-League, and did not make the team.

Bahrain
Under contract with Bahraini Second Division club Isa Town for the 2014–15 season, the defender was satisfied with the experience of playing professionally abroad but expressed desire to go back to Germany.

Return to Germany 
Between 2017 and 2018, Raychouni simultaneously served as head coach and played for CFC Hertha 06 of the German fifth division.

Managerial career
After an experience as player-manager of CFC Hertha 06, in 2018 Raychouni became manager of Berliner AK 07.

References

External links

 
 

1986 births
Living people
Footballers from Berlin
German people of Lebanese descent
German footballers
Lebanese footballers
Association football midfielders
Association football defenders
Lebanese expatriate footballers
German expatriate footballers
Expatriate footballers in Singapore
German expatriate sportspeople in Singapore
Lebanese expatriate sportspeople in Singapore
Singapore Premier League players
Woodlands Wellington FC players
Lebanese Premier League players
Safa SC players
Expatriate footballers in Bahrain
Lebanese expatriate sportspeople in Bahrain
German expatriate sportspeople in Bahrain
Expatriate footballers in Thailand
Lebanese expatriate sportspeople in Thailand
German expatriate sportspeople in Thailand
Lebanese football managers
German football managers